Thomas Edward Aiken (born 16 July 1983) is a South African professional golfer who plays on the European Tour and Sunshine Tour.

Career
Following a successful amateur career, which included being named the South African Amateur of the Year in 2001, Aiken turned professional at the start of 2002. In 2004, he won three times on the Sunshine Tour's Winter Swing. The following year, he topped the money list on the Winter Swing with two further victories.

In 2007, Aiken competed on the Nationwide Tour, but made only three cuts, with a best finish of tied 13th in the Price Cutter Charity Championship. He gained his European Tour card for 2008 through the qualifying school, and went on to finish 131st in the money list, with a best of tied 13th in the Alfred Dunhill Links Championship, his only finish inside the top-30.

The 2009 season saw Aiken register his maiden top-10 finish on the European Tour, with a tied 4th in the Alfred Dunhill Championship, having led going into the final day after a course record 61 in the third round. That, along with several other top-10 finishes, including a win in the Platinum Classic, meant Aiken ended the 2008 Sunshine Tour in third place on the Order of Merit.

A number of top-10 finishes on the European Tour in 2009, including one each in the majors and the World Golf Championships, helped Aiken reach the Dubai World Championship despite holding only partial status on the tour. He finished the season ranked 46th on the Race to Dubai.

In May 2011, Aiken won his first title on the European Tour at the Open de España, winning by two strokes from Anders Hansen. After winning Aiken dedicated the win to home hero Seve Ballesteros who had died the previous day. "I definitely want to dedicate this win to him with it being his home Open and what he gave to his home fans and to golf," said Aiken.

Aiken picked up his second European Tour win at the 2013 Avantha Masters, a tournament co-sanctioned by the Asian Tour.

In 2014, Aiken won the Sunshine Tour's Order of Merit, overtaking Daniel van Tonder in the final tournament.

Aiken has participated several times in the Gary Player Invitational charity tournament.

Professional wins (11)

European Tour wins (3)

1Co-sanctioned by the Asian Tour
2Co-sanctioned by the Sunshine Tour

European Tour playoff record (1–1)

Sunshine Tour wins (8)

1Co-sanctioned by the European Tour

Sunshine Tour playoff record (2–0)

PGA EuroPro Tour wins (1)

Results in major championships
Results not in chronological order in 2020.

CUT = missed the half-way cut
"T" = tied for place
NT = No tournament due to COVID-19 pandemic

Summary

Most consecutive cuts made – 3 (2008 Open Championship – 2010 Open Championship)
Longest streak of top-10s – 1 (twice)

Results in World Golf Championships
Results not in chronological order before 2015.

QF, R16, R32, R64 = Round in which player lost in match play
"T" = Tied

See also
2007 European Tour Qualifying School graduates
2015 Web.com Tour Finals graduates

References

External links

South African male golfers
European Tour golfers
Sunshine Tour golfers
PGA Tour golfers
Korn Ferry Tour graduates
Golfers from Johannesburg
White South African people
1983 births
Living people